Alberto César Stegman (born 1 February 1994) is an Argentine professional footballer who plays as a left-back.

Career
Stegman played for San Lorenzo's academy before joining Tigre. He was an unused substitute for a match with Estudiantes on 13 April 2015 but never made a senior appearance for them. In July 2016, Stegman was loaned to Primera B Nacional's Brown. Twelve appearances followed, which preceded the club signing him permanently on 31 July 2017. He scored his first goal on 15 April 2018 in a win against Santamarina.

In January 2022, Stegman joined San Telmo. However, a week later, his contract was terminated.

Career statistics
.

References

External links

1994 births
Living people
Footballers from Buenos Aires
Argentine footballers
Association football defenders
Primera Nacional players
San Lorenzo de Almagro footballers
Club Atlético Tigre footballers
Club Atlético Brown footballers
San Telmo footballers